This list of Drosera species is a comprehensive listing of all known species of the carnivorous plant genus Drosera.

See also
Taxonomy of Drosera

Notes
a.Years given denote the year of the species's formal publication under the current name, thus excluding the earlier basionym date of publication if one exists.

References
 Barthlott, Wilhelm; Porembski, Stefan; Seine, Rüdiger; Theisen, Inge: Karnivoren. Stuttgart, 2004, 
 Lowrie, Allen: Carnivorous Plants of Australia, Vol. 1-3, Nedlands, Western Australia, 1987 - 1998 
 Schlauer, Jan: A dichotomous key to the genus Drosera L. (Droseraceae), Carnivorous Plant Newsletter, Vol. 25 (1996)

Droseria